Jan Van Winckel (born March 26, 1974) is a Belgian football coach, UEFA and AFC Pro License Instructor and a FIFA Technical Expert. He is senior technical consultant at the United Arab Emirates Football Association and technical advisor of Al-Ahli Saudi. 

Van Winckel holds a UEFA Pro-licence and graduated with a Master in Sport Sciences and a Master in Business Economics from the University of Leuven. He remains faculty of the Movement Control & Neuroplasticity Research Group and is the author of various book and academic articles

Van Winckel was Assistant Coach at Al-Hilal Saudi in 2004. He held the same role at the national team of the United Arab Emirates in 2005.

In 2002, he was at the heart of Belgium's footballing renaissance with Michel Sablon, Marc Van Geersom, Werner Helsen, and Bob Browaeys.

At Olympique de Marseille, Van Winckel acted as Marcelo Bielsa's right hand and first team assistant.

After resigning at Olympique de Marseille, Van Winckel became the technical director of the Saudi Arabian Football Federation in 2015. As technical director, Van Winckel led the Saudi Arabian football team to the World Cup in Russia in 2018.

In 2019, Jan Van Winckel signed as a senior technical consultant to the United Arab Emirates Football Association. He set up the UAE FA 2nd and 3rd division and has launched projects to privatise football clubs in the United Arab Emirates. In 2022, he extended his contract.

In 2022, Van Winckel signed an agreement with Al-Ahli Saudi as technical advisor. He was technical director at the club in 2014-2015 and became vice-champions of Asia.

Career

As Player 
 1994-1995 : Belgian Champion University football
 1996-1997 : Belgian Champion University football
 1994-1997 : Belgian national University team
 1996-1997 : Belgian national University futsal team
 2001-2002 : 7th most valuable player Belgian Futsal Association
 2001-2002 : 5th best goal scorer Belgian Futsal Association
 2001-2002 : Final Belgian Cup Belgian Futsal Association
 2001-2002 : Selected for the national futsal team

As Coach 
 1994-2000 : Stade Leuven 
 2000-2002 : KV Mechelen 
 2002-2004 : Al-Hilal FC 
 2004-2006 : United Arab Emirates national football team 
 2006-2008 : Belgium national football team *Scout 
 2006-2011 : Club Brugge KV 
 2011-2012 : Beerschot AC 
 2014-2015 : Olympique de Marseille

As Technical Director 
 2012-2014 : Al-Ahli SC (Jeddah) 
 2015-2018  : Saudi Arabian Football Federation

Others 
 2015 -    : Asian Football Confederation Member of Expert Panels on Coach Education & Youth Development
 2015 -    : Saudi Arabian Olympic Committee Member of Mass Participation Committee and High Performance Committee

Honours 
 1997-1998 : Belgian Champion University football 
 2000-2002 : KV Mechelen  : Winner Belgian League 
 2002-2005 : Al-Hilal FC  : Winner Saudi Crown Prince Cup and Saudi Federation Cup 
 2005-2006 : United Arab Emirates national football team  : Qualified for AFC Asian Cup and Gulf Cup of Nations and winner of Kirin Cup
 2006      : Swaziland national football team  : Second place COSAFA Cup
 2006-2011 : Club Brugge KV  : Winner of Belgian Cup
 2013-2014 : Al-Ahli SC (Jeddah)  : Vice-champion AFC Champions League
 2015-2017    : Saudi Arabian Football Federation  : Winner of Gulf Cup
 2018  : Saudi Arabian Football Federation  : Qualified for the FIFA World Cup in Russia

Bibliography 
Fitness in Soccer - The science and practical application with Tenney D, Helsen W, McMillan K, Meert JP, Bradley P, Moveo Ergo Sum, Leuven 2014, www.fitnessinsoccer.com
Voetbalconditie - Tussen praktijk en wetenschap door Jean Pierre Meert , Werner Helsen , Kenny Mcmillan , David Tenney , Jan Van Winckel. ACCO Uitgeverij. Publicatiedatum: 28 maart 2014. Pagina's: 608.

References

Place of birth missing (living people)
Belgian football managers
1974 births
Living people
Expatriate football managers in Eswatini
Belgian expatriate football managers
Beerschot A.C. non-playing staff
Club Brugge KV non-playing staff
Olympique de Marseille non-playing staff
Belgian expatriate sportspeople in Eswatini
Belgian expatriate sportspeople in Saudi Arabia
Belgian expatriate sportspeople in the United Arab Emirates
Belgian expatriate sportspeople in France
People from Duffel
Sportspeople from Antwerp Province